For officer ranks in Denmark, see:
Ranks and insignia of Royal Danish Army
Ranks and insignia of Royal Danish Navy
Ranks and insignia of Royal Danish Air Force